Lamprodrilus is a genus of annelids belonging to the family Lumbriculidae.

Species:
 Lamprodrilus achaetus
 Lamprodrilus isoporus

References

Lumbriculidae